The 1982 Tangerine Bowl was held on December 18, 1982 at the Orlando Stadium in Orlando, Florida.  The #18 Auburn Tigers defeated the Boston College Eagles by a score of 33–26.

Notability 
The 1982 Tangerine Bowl was the last to be called the Tangerine Bowl; the name was changed to the Florida Citrus Bowl for the 1983 game.

Game summary 
The first quarter was somewhat slow compared to the rest of the game; Boston College opened the scoring as Doug Flutie found the end zone on a 5-yard rush to put BC up 7–0. Auburn countered, though, scoring a 19-yard field goal. The first quarter ended 7–3. Auburn's offense turned it on in the second quarter, scoring on a Bo Jackson 1-yard rush and another 2-yard rush to take a 17–7 lead. BC converted a 34-yard field goal but Auburn found the end zone once again as Jackson scored from 6 yards out, though the two-point conversion failed and the second quarter ended 23–10. The third quarter saw Auburn's lead extend from 17 to 27 as they scored twice more, from a 23-yard field goal and then from a 15-yard rush. BC retaliated in the fourth, though, as Doug Flutie delivered two touchdown passes and was responsible for both successful two-point conversions. The 16-point comeback wasn't enough, as Auburn won the game, 33–26.

Aftermath 
Auburn's win saw them rise in the polls and finish at #14. Boston College, who entered the game unranked, remained unranked.

Auburn fullback Greg Pratt, who scored a touchdown in the game and entered the next season as the starting fullback, died in spring practice after collapsing from heat exhaustion in spring practice.

References 

Tangerine Bowl
Citrus Bowl (game)
Auburn Tigers football bowl games
Boston College Eagles football bowl games
Tangerine Bowl
Tangerine Bowl